MCJ and Cool G were a four-time Juno Award–nominated Canadian hip hop duo from Halifax, Nova Scotia. The duo were James McQuaid (MCJ), originally part of the Halifax hip hop group New Beginning, and Richard Gray (Cool G). MCJ was the rapper and Cool G mostly sang the choruses.  Their sound was new jack swing which was popular at the time.

History
MCJ and Cool G grew up in Halifax, Nova Scotia. They relocated together to Montreal in 1988 with plans to enter the music business.  In 1989, they signed to Capitol Records in Canada, becoming the first Canadian rap group to be signed to a major label.

In 1990, they released their debut album So Listen which featured the singles "So Listen" and "Smooth as Silk" which were typical of their rhythm and blues influenced style.

MCJ and Cool G have been nominated for four Juno Awards.  In 1991, they were nominated for Best R&B/Soul Recording with So Listen, Rap Recording of the Year with So Listen, and Single of the Year with "So Listen".  In 1994, they were nominated for Best R&B/Soul Recording with Love Me Right.

The African Nova Scotian Music Association awarded them the Music Pioneer Award in 2007.

See also

Music of Canada

References

External links
 So Listen music video at YouTube
 That's L.I.F.E. music video at YouTube
 

Black Canadian musical groups
Musical groups established in 1988
Musical groups disestablished in 1997
Musical groups from Halifax, Nova Scotia
New jack swing music groups
Canadian hip hop groups
Hip hop duos
1988 establishments in Nova Scotia
1997 disestablishments in Nova Scotia